"I Prefer the Moonlight" is a song written by Gary Chapman and Mark Wright, and recorded by American country music artist Kenny Rogers. It was released in September 1987 as the second single and title track from the album I Prefer the Moonlight.  The song reached number 2 on the Billboard Hot Country Singles & Tracks chart. Kim Carnes is a guest vocalist in this song.

Chart performance

References

1987 singles
1987 songs
Kenny Rogers songs
RCA Records singles
Songs written by Mark Wright (record producer)
Songs written by Gary Chapman (musician)